Lists of Thai actors are split by sex.

 List of Thai actresses, female actors
 List of Thai male actors

Thai